United Nations Security Council resolution 815, adopted unanimously on 30 March 1993, after reaffirming Resolution 743 (1992) and all subsequent relevant resolutions concerning the United Nations Protection Force (UNPROFOR) including 802 (1993) and 807 (1993), the council, acting under Chapter VII of the United Nations Charter, extended UNPROFOR's mandate for an additional interim period ending 30 June 1993.

The council members also noted that it would reconsider UNPROFOR's mandate one month after the adoption of the current resolution in light of any new developments. It also reaffirmed its support for the co-chairmen of the steering committee of the International Conference on the Former Yugoslavia in their efforts to help to define the future status of those territories comprising the United Nations Protected Areas which are integral parts of Croatia, demanding full respect for the Geneva Conventions and international humanitarian law in these areas and freedom of movement for UNPROFOR.

See also
 Breakup of Yugoslavia
 Bosnian War
 Croatian War of Independence
 List of United Nations Security Council Resolutions 801 to 900 (1993–1994)
 Yugoslav Wars

References

External links
 
Text of the Resolution at undocs.org

 0815
 0815
1993 in Croatia
1993 in Yugoslavia
1993 in Bosnia and Herzegovina
March 1993 events
 0815